Chris Kappler (born February 9, 1967) is an American show jumper and horse trainer. He is an Olympic gold and silver medalist, and the winner of over 100 Grand Prixs. He is a founder of the North American Riders Group.

Early life
Kappler grew up in Barrington, Illinois. He started riding at age nine, and began his show career training with Alex Jayne. He was discovered by George Morris and trained at Morris' stable, Hunterdon. He placed second in the USEF Medal Finals, third in the ASPCA Maclay Finals, and second in the USET Talent Search Finals.

Career
Kappler worked for George Morris for almost 25 years. Kappler was named Midwest Rider of the Year in 1987, 1988, 1989 and 1991. In 1989, he won the Lionel Guerrand-Hermes Trophy. He won the American Invitational and American Gold Cup three times each, and won the American Grand Prix Championship once. At the 2003 Pan American Games, Kappler won the team gold and individual silver riding Royal Kaliber. Also in 2003, Kappler was named the Equestrian of the Year by the United States Equestrian Federation. In 2004, Kappler represented the United States at the Olympic Games. Riding Royal Kaliber, he won team gold and individual silver. Kappler won the Budweiser Invitational in Tampa on his horse VDL Oranta in 2009.

Kappler was a US Team Selector for the 2015 Pan American Games and the 2016 Summer Olympics. Kappler has been a USEF committee member.

By 2018, Kappler decided to stop riding competitively and focus on training horses and riders. He often travels to teach clinics.

Personal life
Kappler is a resident of the Pittstown section of Franklin Township, Hunterdon County, New Jersey.

References

External links
 Official website

1967 births
Equestrians at the 2004 Summer Olympics
Living people
American male equestrians
Olympic gold medalists for the United States in equestrian
Olympic silver medalists for the United States in equestrian
People from St. Charles, Illinois
People from Franklin Township, Hunterdon County, New Jersey
American show jumping riders
Medalists at the 2004 Summer Olympics
Equestrians at the 2003 Pan American Games
Pan American Games gold medalists for the United States
Pan American Games medalists in equestrian
Medalists at the 2003 Pan American Games